One Day, Forever is an album by saxophonist/composer Benny Golson that was recorded between 1996 and 2000 and released by the Arkadia Jazz label in 2001.

Reception

The AllMusic review by Ken Dryden said "Benny Golson has made many excellent recordings over the decades, but One Day, Forever is in a class by itself".
All About Jazz stated "The result is a CD in three mentalities, all of which are contained by Golson's imagination: the famous sextet sound that produced numbers like “Killer Joe,” a string orchestra backing Shirley Horn as she sings the words to Golson’s new music, and a piano piece introducing Golson’s first classical composition. While not consistent in theme, One Day, Forever does reveal in startling contrast the creative curiosity of Benny Golson ... Certainly, one could say that One Day, Forever contains something for everyone".
JazzTimes' Harvey Siders observed "One Day Forever is a tour de force for Benny Golson. This is an elaborate sampler of his talents as composer-arranger, lyricist and tenor saxophonist ... So many facets of Benny Golson are on display here".

Track listing 
All compositions by Benny Golson
 "One Day, Forever (I Remember Miles)" – 5:08
 "Blue Walk" – 6:18
 "Killer Joe" – 7:54
 "Are You Real?" – 6:59
 "Sad to Say" – 4:46
 "Out of the Past" – 9:18
 "Blues Alley" – 4:13
 "Along Came Betty" – 7:36
 "On Gossamer Wings" – 10:20

Personnel 
Tracks 2–4 & 6–8:
Benny Golson – tenor saxophone 
Art Farmer – trumpet 
Curtis Fuller – trombone 
Geoff Keezer – piano
Dwayne Burno – bass 
Joe Farnsworth – drums 
Tracks 1 & 5:
Benny Golson – tenor saxophone, arranger, conductor
Robert Carlisle, John Clark – French horn
Elizabeth Mann – flute
Gerard Reuter – oboe
Mulgrew Miller – piano
Bill Mays – keyboards
Ron Carter – bass
Carl Allen – drums
Shirley Horn – vocals
Clay Ruede, David Heiss, Diane Barere, Eliana Mendoza, Erik Friedlander, Eugene Moye, Frederick Zlotkin, Jeanne Leblanc, Joseph Kimura, Lanny Paykin, Maxine Neuman, Richard Locker – cello
Track 9:
Lara Downes – piano

Production
Bob Karcy – producer
Dennis Wall – engineer

References 

Benny Golson albums
2001 albums
Arkadia Jazz albums